Phantom of Death ( is a 1988 Italian giallo film directed by Ruggero Deodato. It starred Michael York, Donald Pleasence and Edwige Fenech.

Plot 
Robert Dominici is a pianist who suffers from a genetic condition that causes him to physically age at a rapid pace and also to go mad. Distraught by his condition, Dominici goes on a killing spree. Inspector Datti sets off to catch him. Meanwhile, Dominici targets the Inspector's daughter, Gloria.

Cast

Production 

Phantom of Death had a script developed in the early 1980s by Gianfranco Clerici and Vincenzo Mannino which later became the basis for the script for Lucio Fulci's The New York Ripper (1982). According to Clerici, the two were offended by how their script was changed and continued to edit it before giving it to director Ruggero Deodato. Parts of the story that were used in The New York Ripper remain in the film, such as the killer who disguises their voice and taunts the police.

Deodato has stated that "I did Phantom of Death because it was based on a true element – the idea of growing old [...] And I got to work with Michael York and Donald Pleasence."

On the film as a whole, he commented that "some parts look like an 'A' production. But it seemed too long in the final part." He added that Edwige Fenech was miscast, and was only included because the producer wanted her in the film.

Release
The film was released in 1988. According to film critic and historian Roberto Curti, the film has "passable box-office" results. The film was released in Germany on home video as Off Balance - Der Tod wartest in Venedig and in Holland and Belgium as an English-language version as Off Balance. In the United States, it was released by Vidmark as Phantom of Death. It has received further DVD releases on home video by Shameless as Phantom of Death.

Reception
From contemporary reviews, "Lor." of Variety commented that the film had "little suspense". The review noted that York had "solid thesping which engenders some pathos for the central figure" and added that Pino Donaggio's score was "lush".

In his book Blood & Black Lace (1999), dedicated to Italian horror and sex films, Adrian Luther Smith described the film as an "unexpectedly thoughtful production", and a "austere horror/giallo hybrid", finding it having a strong cast and "some choice moments of gore." Curti wrote in his book Italian Giallo in Film and Television that the film was "somewhat slow" but was "graced by the director's capable technique".

References

Sources

External links 

 
 
 

Films directed by Ruggero Deodato
Films scored by Pino Donaggio
1988 horror films
Italian horror films
English-language Italian films
Giallo films
1980s Italian films